The National Arts Foundation, Incorporated., was a private American New York not-for-profit corporation devoted to promoting fine arts.  Robert Carleton Smith (1908–1984) founded the organization in 1947, served as its president and later as Chairman of its Advisory Committee.

People 
 Vaughan Williams – voted The National Arts Foundation of America's "outstanding musician of 1953"

References 

Arts foundations based in the United States
Arts organizations established in 1947
1947 establishments in New York (state)